Gas is an animated short, directed by Chuck Jones and first released in May 1944. It features Private Snafu learning the value of a gas mask in warfare. The cartoon was produced by Warner Bros. Cartoons. The script writers for the Snafu cartoons were typically uncredited, though animation historians consider that several of them were written or co-written by Dr. Seuss and Munro Leaf.

Plot 
 
The film is set in a military camp, with a sign informing viewers that the camp is situated at a distance of 3642.5 miles (5862 kilometers) from Brooklyn. An alarm alerts the soldiers to wear their gas masks and assemble at a predetermined area of the camp. Every soldier rushes to complete the task, except for Snafu who has trouble locating his gas mask case. He is the last soldier to arrive to the assembly grounds, and has yet to actually wear his mask. When Snafu opens the case, he reaches in and retrieves first a sheer bra, then Bugs Bunny, and last his mask. His lack of organization skills earns him the attention of the Commanding General. He is singled out for additional drills & exercises with his gas mask by his 1st Sergeant.

Following his training, an exhausted Snafu discards his gas mask and leaves it with the trash waiting to be collected. He proceeds to rest under a tree in an idyllic meadow, at a short distance from the camp. While he rests, a passing airplane sprays poison gas. The gas takes the form of an anthropomorphic gas cloud and parachutes its way to the ground. Spotting Snafu as the easiest target around, it begins surrounding him. As Snafu relaxes under the tree, he comments on "the smell of new-mown hay, apple blossoms, flypaper..." whereupon he finally realizes that he is in danger of being gassed.

Snafu barely manages to escape breathing the gas and "frantically chases the trash truck" to retrieve his gas mask. While the gas cloud seems to sweep over both the soldier and the truck, Snafu emerges triumphant. He had managed to wear the mask before breathing the poison. Night finds Snafu sleeping with his gas mask at hand, "in a lover's embrace". In a flirtatious manner, the mask comments "I didn't know you cared" and the short ends.

Analysis 

The extensive use of chemical weapons in World War I had left a lasting impression. During World War II, there were fears that chemical warfare would again be used against both military targets and civilians. In practice, all major combatants of the War stockpiled chemical weapons, but these weapons were rarely used and played a minimal role in the conflict.

The short was part of the ongoing efforts of the military to convince soldiers that their gas masks were more than "dead weight". As the war progressed and the expected chemical warfare did not occur, soldiers were increasingly likely to view both the masks and their training in using them as essentially useless.

Sources

References

External links
 
 

1944 films
1944 animated films
1944 short films
1940s animated short films
Private Snafu
Short films directed by Chuck Jones
Articles containing video clips
Films scored by Carl Stalling
Films produced by Leon Schlesinger
Bugs Bunny films
American black-and-white films
1944 comedy films
1940s Warner Bros. animated short films